Lepenica may refer to:

Bosnia and Herzegovina
 Lepenica (Fojnica), a river
 Lepenica (Rogatica), a village
 Lepenica, Tešanj, a village

Croatia
 , a village near Šibenik

Serbia
 Lepenica (Great Morava), a river
 Lepenica (region), a region
 Lepenica (Vladičin Han), a village
 Lepenica, Mačva, a village